The Revolutionary Party of Young Annam was a political party in the colony of Annam of French Indochina in Vietnam.

History
It was founded in 1925, and was based amongst the petty bourgeoisie in northern Annam. It had its roots in a group of former political prisoners, that had been jailed in connection with the 1908 uprising. 

The group began having contacts with revolutionary groups in China and Siam after the First World War.
 
Within the party there were both nationalist and communist tendencies. Internal factional conflict weakened the party. In 1929 the communists broke away. The party was dissolved in 1930, after a police crackdown banned it.

References

1925 establishments in Vietnam
1930 disestablishments in Vietnam
Banned political parties in Vietnam
Defunct political parties in Vietnam
Nationalist parties in Vietnam
Political parties disestablished in 1930
Political parties established in 1925
Communist parties in Vietnam